The 2008 Portimão Superbike World Championship round was the last round of the 2008 Superbike World Championship season. It took place on the weekend of October 31-November 2, 2008, at the Autódromo Internacional do Algarve.

Superbike race 1 classification

Superbike race 2 classification

Supersport race classification

References

Portimao Round
Superbike World Championship round